Rozaina Adam (Dhivehi: ރޮޒައިނާ އާދަމް; born 12 December 1976) is a Member of Parliament in Maldives, who represents the Addu Meedhoo constituency. She has been a member of Parliament since August 2008 to date. 

She is the Majority Chief Whip of the Maldivian Parliament as well as the Chair of the Independent Institutions Committee. In addition to this, she is also a member of the Human Rights and Gender committee. MP Rozaina is an executive board member of PGA – Parliamentarians for Global Action. She is the chair of PGA's most recent initiative, PARRT – Parliamentary Rapid Response Team. She is also WPL's (Women Political Leaders) ambassador for the Maldives.

Rozaina was appointed as the deputy leader of Maldivian Democratic Party (MDP) parliamentary group on 2 June 2014 and filled this post until 2 July 2019. She represented the Thulusdhoo constituency in 17th People's Majlis. Before joining the Maldivian Democratic Party, MDP, she was a deputy leader of Dhivehi Rayyithunge Party, DRP. 

She is a champion of children's and women's rights in the Maldives. She has also published a set of children's books to teach children to read and write in Dhivehi, the native language of Maldives, for which she received a presidential award.

Education 

Rozaina holds a master's degree in Marketing from University of Western Australia, and a bachelor's degree in Management and Marketing from Curtin University of Technology, Australia. She also has a certificate in Teaching Middle School Science and Mathematics.

Political career
Rozaina was first appointed to the parliament as a representative of the president in 2008. After the new constitution of the Maldives was passed, she was elected in 2009 to represent the Thulusdhoo constituency of Kaafu Atoll and was elected on a Dhivehi Rayyithunge Party (DRP) ticket. Rozaina was appointed as one of the deputy leaders of DRP on 23 April 2013. She was also president and vice president of DRP Women's Wing. Rozaina was a council member of DRP. She stepped down from her post on 18 November 2013 and joined Maldivian Democratic Party, MDP. She was elected to the parliament in 2019 on an MDP ticket to represent AdduMeedhoo constituency and re elected again for the same seat in 2019. She presented the bill on preventing domestic violence and also sponsored the bill on preventing work place harassment and also the bill on protecting child rights. In addition to this, Rozaina is also a member MDP National council.

On 13 August 2020, MP Rozaina Ahmed vocalized her despair on President Mohamed Nasheed for using parliament to intimidate Ministers and government officials. She stated her view after Economic Minister Fayyaz Ahmed was nominated for a No-Confidence vote.

Married life 

Rozaina is married to Mohamed Nashiz since 1997. He is the Member of Parliament for Kimbidhoo constituency in the 19th parliament and was also the former Member of Parliament for Alifushi constituency in 17th Majlis. They have two children: a daughter, Zaina Nashiz, and a son, Zain Nashiz.

References

Members of the People's Majlis
Dhivehi Rayyithunge Party politicians
1976 births
Living people
21st-century Maldivian women politicians
21st-century Maldivian politicians